The Croatian Labour Party is a minor Croatian party without political representation. The Party has about 400 members. It was founded in 1999 in Samobor. It follows teachings of Croatian nationalist Ante Starčević.

On 2007 parliamentary elections it was a part of the  coalition led by Social Democratic Action of Croatia.

In the 2014 European Parliament election, the party received 0.35% of the vote.

Electoral history

Legislative

European Parliament

References

1999 establishments in Croatia
Labour parties
Political parties established in 1999
Political parties in Croatia